Unifi TV (stylized as unifi tv, formerly known as HyppTV prior to January 2018) is an IPTV service operated by Telekom Malaysia (TM). It was launched in 2010 as part of TM's bundled Triple-play service offering of VoIP Telephone, Internet and IPTV called unifi.

History

On 12 January 2018, as part of a true convergence initiative by TM, HyppTV and HyppTV Everywhere was rebranded to unifi TV and unifi playTV respectively.

In January 2019, TM temporarily stopped offering free unifi TV set-top boxes for new unifi Home and broadband customers, instead providing free access to unifi playTV, citing changing consumer behaviours of watching content on the go and the rising trend of OTT streaming. However, this resulted in new unifi TV users being unable to enjoy benefits the unifi TV set-top box had, such as improved visual quality and watching channels exclusive to the set-top box (such as majority channels from The Walt Disney Company Asia Pacific, joining contests and using TV apps).

On 15 January 2020, unifi TV launched the unifi Plus Box, which ran off Android TV. The box was manufactured by Skyworth Digital. It introduced new features such as the delivery of 4K content through the unifi TV app and as of 2022 comes with several pre-installed streaming apps including iflix, BBC Player, YuppTV, and Viu. Ultimate Pack subscribers have free access to Disney+ Hotstar, BBC Player, SPOTV NOW and beIN Sports Connect.

On 30 June 2020, the unifi TV app was updated to allow subscribers to download the app on other Android TV devices without the need for the Plus Box. The app is available on Google-certified devices, and to users which have been migrated.

Services
The service is being offered to residential and business customers in Malaysia over an optical fiber network via Fiber to the Home (FTTH) for landed properties and VDSL2 for high rise properties.

This IPTV service was later offered to Streamyx ADSL2+ (now called as "Broadband" or "pre-unifi") customers. However, due to the technical limitations of ADSL on copper line, certain features like picture-in-picture (PiP) and high-definition (HD) available to unifi customers are not available for Streamyx customers. The bandwidth is also shared for both Internet and IPTV for Streamyx customers.

The IPTV service is also available to all mobile device subscribers with the unifi playTV (officially known as playtv@unifi) app (formerly known as HyppTV Everywhere) for Android and iOS. Each unifi TV subscriber is entitled to two free mobile devices for watching, and customers are free to sign up for extra packages on an à-la-carte basis. A specially-priced data plan may be purchased from several telcos to ensure watching shows doesn't drain the data quota of the phone.

Television channels

Notes
All premium channels are also available via the à la carte option from as low as RM6/month. Terms and conditions apply.
 Only offers a 16:9 standard definition (SD) quality for now.
 Only playTV@unifi subscribers or set-top box users can access this channel.
 playTV@unifi subscribers registered via mobile number can purchase this channel.

Radio channels

Video-on-demand (VOD)

See also
Television in Malaysia
Digital television in Malaysia

References

External links

2010 establishments in Malaysia
TM Group of Companies